Iskra Delta 800 was a PDP-11/34-compatible computer developed by Iskra Delta in 1984.

Specifications
 CPU: J11
 RAM: Up to 4 MiB addressable
 ROM: 4 KiB
 Operating system: Delta/M (somewhat modified RSX-11M)

External links
Old-computers.com article

Computer-related introductions in 1984
PDP-11